Fabian Gerber (born 28 November 1979) is a German former professional footballer who played as a midfielder. He is the son of Franz Gerber, also a former football player, and manager.

References

External links
 

Living people
1979 births
German footballers
Footballers from Munich
Association football midfielders
Germany B international footballers
Bundesliga players
2. Bundesliga players
3. Liga players
TuS Celle FC players
Hannover 96 players
FC St. Pauli players
SC Freiburg players
1. FSV Mainz 05 players
OFI Crete F.C. players
FC Ingolstadt 04 players
German expatriate footballers
German expatriate sportspeople in Greece
Expatriate footballers in Greece